Utah State University Eastern (USU Eastern) is a public regional college within the Utah State University system. The USU Eastern campus is located in Price, Utah, United States. Founded as Carbon College in 1937, the college joined the University of Utah system in 1959 for 10 years and was renamed College of Eastern Utah (CEU). In 1969, the Utah System of Higher Education was created ending the relationship between the University of Utah and CEU. CEU entered the USU system on July 1, 2010 as Utah State University Eastern. With more than 60 degree programs, the college focuses on technical, vocational, and associate degree programs. USU Eastern competes as the Eagles and is the only statewide USU campus, apart from the Logan campus, that has an athletics program.

History
Carbon College was formed on February 20, 1937 by the State of Utah and classes began in October 1938 with approximately 100 students. The newly formed college faced financial difficulties in 1953 when a budget-cutting measure was proposed to dismantle the college and sell the property. The issue went to the ballot during the election of 1954 with 56,000 petition signatures and a subsequent 78% of the vote to reject such a measure.

In 1959, the college was joined with the University of Utah and acted as a branch of the University for 10 years. During the partnership, the campus grew significantly and the college became known as College of Eastern Utah (CEU). During the 1960s, CEU added several new buildings including the Geary Theater, Music Building, Science Center, and Library. In 1969, the Utah System of Higher Education was created ending the relationship between the University of Utah and CEU.

During the 1970s, CEU began to focus on the mission of being a vocational-technical school for the community. Degrees were expanded to include welding, automotive mechanics, machine shop, cosmetology, diesel mechanics, and a registered nursing program. CEU expanded courses to be taught at the San Juan Center. After the start of the 21st century, courses and enrollment began to climb to more than 2,000 students enrolled in more than 400 courses.

In 2010, the College of Eastern Utah merged with Utah State University creating Utah State University Eastern (USU Eastern). Shortly after the merger, Joe Peterson, a former vice president of instruction at Salt Lake Community College, became the school's first chancellor, reporting directly to USU president Stan L. Albrecht.

Campus
Situated in the center of Price, Utah, USU Eastern's campus is set on about 12 acres (4.9 ha) and is surrounded by geological and recreational features including the San Rafael Swell, Arches National Park, Canyonlands National Park, and the Cleveland-Lloyd Dinosaur Quarry. It is one of USU’s three residential campuses to ensure students have access to housing and dining while attending USU Eastern. 

USU Eastern is also home to an accredited museum, the renowned USU Eastern Prehistoric Museum. In 2011, Utah State University received a confidential gift of 25 acres near the USU Eastern campus, nearly tripling the size of the campus. The estimated value for the donation exceeds $4 million. The City of Price and USU have already been working on the USU Energy and Education Research Park just west of the donated parcel of land.

Academics
USU Eastern offers more than 60 degree programs in academic, technical, and vocational fields. 

Discipline and degree options include anthropology, criminal justice, museum studies, biology, geology, business, diesel equipment technology, and small business development. USU Eastern operates under an open admissions policy, meaning that if one applies and has either graduated from high school or earned a GED, they are accepted. Since 2020, Utah State University, including USU Eastern, has been test-optional, meaning students do not need to submit ACT/SAT scores for admission.

Athletics
USU Eastern competes athletically as the Utah State Eastern Eagles and is the only campus in the USU statewide system to have its own athletics program. The Eagles are a member of the Scenic West Athletic Conference (SWAC) and the National Junior College Athletic Association (NJCAA). The Bunnell Dmitrich Athletic Center serves as a venue for many of the athletic events.

The Eagles compete in men's baseball, soccer and basketball and women's basketball, softball, soccer, and volleyball. In 2021, the volleyball team captured their first-ever SWAC regular-season title.

Starting in 2016, they compete in rodeo and have a spirit squad consisting of a cheerleading squad, dance team, drumline, and mascot. The rodeo enjoyed tremendous success in their first ever trip to the CNFR, placing 12th overall. 

Additionally there are several intramural sports such as ultimate frisbee, flag football, and volleyball.

References

External links
USU Eastern official site
Utah State University official site
USU Eastern Prehistoric Museum
Alumni Home Page

Utah State University
Public universities and colleges in Utah
Buildings and structures in Carbon County, Utah
Universities and colleges accredited by the Northwest Commission on Colleges and Universities
Education in Carbon County, Utah
Education in San Juan County, Utah
NJCAA athletics
1937 establishments in Utah